Judith Eveleigh King (1926–2010, also known as Judith Marlow) was a British zoologist who specialised on seals. After graduating with honours from the University of London in 1948, she worked for 20 years in London at the Natural History section of the British Museum, and from 1969 to 1984 in the zoology department of the University of New South Wales. As well as publishing scholarly papers on taxonomy, her books Marine Mammals with Richard Harrison, and Seals of the World (1964, updated 1983) are standard reference works.

References

1926 births
2010 deaths
British zoologists
People from Essex
British expatriates in Australia